Albert Michel (1909–1981) was a French stage, film and television actor.

Selected filmography

 Je chante (1938) - Un laitier (uncredited)
 Ne bougez plus (1941) - Clanpinet
 Chèque au porteur (1941)
 Fièvres (1942)
 Croisières sidérales (1942) - Un employé au commissariat (uncredited)
 Pontcarral (1942)
 Haut le vent (1942) - Un passager du bateau
 Love Story (1943) - (uncredited)
 Voyage Without Hope (1943) - Un membre d'équipage (uncredited)
 La vie de plaisir (1944) - Un écclésiastique (uncredited)
 Le bossu (1944)
 François Villon (1945) - Le paysan accusé
 Sylvie et le fantôme (1946) - Gabriel (uncredited)
 Jericho (1946) - Le correspondant qui vient de Hollande
 Les J3 (1946)
 Trente et quarante (1946) - Le voyageur bègue dans le train
 Mensonges (1946) - Le greffier de la prison
 The Sea Rose (1946) - Un mécanicien
 Nuits d'alerte (1946) - (uncredited)
 A Lover's Return (1946) - Le pompier de service (uncredited)
 Six Hours to Lose (1947) - Le porteur
 Man About Town (1947) - Zanzi
 Devil in the Flesh (1947) - Le vendeur de chambres à coucher
 Naughty Martine (1947) - Gustave
 Le château de la dernière chance (1947) - L'habilleur
 Un flic (1947) - Albert
 Third at Heart (1947) - Bastien
 Danger de mort (1947) - Un employé à la gare (uncredited)
 D'homme à hommes (1948) - Le portier (uncredited)
 Croisière pour l'inconnu (1948) - Le bosco
 L'assassin est à l'écoute (1948) - Le pompier (uncredited)
 Monelle (1948) - Le chef de bureau (uncredited)
 Cité de l'espérance (1948) - Le père La Fraise
 The Cupboard Was Bare (1948) - Un agent (uncredited)
 Jean de la Lune (1949) - Le monsieur tamponné (uncredited)
 Fantomas Against Fantomas (1949) - Un agent (uncredited)
 L'échafaud peut attendre (1949) - L'infirmier
 Jo la Romance (1949) - Le valet de chambre
 La bataille du feu (1949) - Un conseiller
 The Cupid Club (1949) - Le gardien
 Je n'aime que toi... (1949) - Un garçon de café du Négresco (uncredited)
 Thus Finishes the Night (1949) - Le contrôleur
 Barry (1949) - Un moine (uncredited)
 Keep an Eye on Amelia (1949) - Un spectateur
 Mademoiselle de la Ferté (1949) - Le facteur
 Vient de paraître (1949) - Un journaliste
 Eve and the Serpent (1949) - Le valet de chambre
 The King (1949) - Un inspecteur
 La souricière (1950) - Un prévenu (uncredited)
 Une nuit de noces (1950) - L'inspecteur
 Le 84 prend des vacances (1950) - Le représentant en aspirateurs
 My Friend Sainfoin (1950) - Le garçon
 Prélude à la gloire (1950) - Le coiffeur
 Rendez-vous avec la chance (1950) - Le contrôleur SNCF
 Cartouche, King of Paris (1950) - L'espion
 Justice Is Done (1950) - Le gendarme porteur de la convocation (uncredited)
 God Needs Men (1950) - Le Bail
 Three Telegrams (1950) - Le cafetier
 The King of the Bla Bla Bla (1950) - Charlie
 The Glass Castle (1950) - Le charmeur d'oiseaux
 Without Leaving an Address (1951) - Monsieur Marpin - un futur papa
 Demain nous divorçons (1951) - Le valet de chambre
 My Seal and Them (1951) - Le poissonnier
 Les petites Cardinal (1951) - Le gendarme
 Shadow and Light (1951) - Le patron
 Le plus joli péché du monde (1951) - Le domestique (uncredited)
 Coq en pâte (1951)
 Gibier de potence (1951) - Antoine (uncredited)
 The Cape of Hope (1951) - Un joueur de cartes
 Alone in Paris (1951) - Le 1er employé du commissariat
 Paris Still Sings (1951) - Un agent (uncredited)
 Jocelyn (1952)
 My Wife, My Cow and Me (1952)
 Matrimonial Agency (1952) - Le pêcheur (uncredited)
 Drôle de noce (1952) - Le fils Cornil
  (1952) - Le brigadier (segment "Les témoignages d'un enfant de choeur")
 Beauties of the Night (1952) - Le facteur / Un révolutionnaire
 The Moment of Truth (1952) - Le second comédien en tournée
 Rayés des vivants (1952)
 The Last Robin Hood (1953) - Un gendarme
 Le témoin de minuit (1953) - Minor rôle (uncredited)
 Follow That Man (1953) - Le contrôleur de la prison
 Innocents in Paris (1953) - Traffic Officer (uncredited)
 I Vinti (1953) - Le père de Georges (uncredited)
 The Earrings of Madame de… (1953) - Le second cocher du baron (uncredited)
 Virgile (1953) - Trouillard
 My Brother from Senegal (1953) - Le gendarme de la route (uncredited)
 Daughters of Destiny (1954) - Un moine (segment "Jeanne")
 Royal Affairs in Versailles (1954) - Un citoyen (uncredited)
 The Unfrocked One (1954) - Le prêtre qui absout Madame Morand
 Les révoltés de Lomanach (1954) - Le soldat qui se rase (uncredited)
 Le Secret d'Hélène Marimon (1954) - Le soldat convalescent
 The Lovers of Marianne (1954) - Un villageois
 The Bed (1954) - Un déménageur (segment "Le lit de la Pompadour") (uncredited)
 The Sheep Has Five Legs (1954) - Le patron du bistrot
 Service Entrance (1954) - Le sacristain - ami de Grimaldi
 Obsession (1954) - Le réptionniste de l'hôtel rouennais
 The Red and the Black (1954) - Le sonneur (uncredited)
 Papa, Mama, the Maid and I (1954) - Le souffleur à la représentation
 Le fil à la patte (1954) - Jean - le domestique du comte
 Le vicomte de Bragelonne (1954) - Le gardien (uncredited)
 Casse-cou, mademoiselle! (1955)
 Caroline and the Rebels (1955) - Le fonctionnaire de la prison (uncredited)
 Men in White (1955) - Un paysan
 Les évadés (1955) - Un prisonnier
 Papa, maman, ma femme et moi (1955) - L'employé S.N.C.F. (uncredited)
 The Impossible Mr. Pipelet (1955) - Le capitaine des pompiers
 Chiens perdus sans collier (1955) - L'agriculteur voisin demandant l'échelle
 Gas-Oil (1955) - Le facteur
 La Madelon (1955) - Isidore (uncredited)
 The Affair of the Poisons (1955) - Gobet
 Impasse des vertus (1955) - L'hôtelier
 On déménage le colonel (1955) - Un gendarme
 If Paris Were Told to Us (1956) - Jacques Michel / Un Consommateur (uncredited)
 La Bande à papa (1956) - L'adjudant des pompiers (uncredited)
 Le secret de soeur Angèle (1956) - Un infirmier
 Meeting in Paris (1956) - Le serrurier (uncredited)
 Le sang à la tête (1956) - Duleux, le chef de gare (uncredited)
 Fernand cow-boy (1956) - Le geôlier
 La Traversée de Paris (1956) - Le concierge de la rue de Turenne (uncredited)
 Soupçons (1956) - Le garde chasse
 The Hunchback of Notre Dame (1956) - Night Watchman
 L'amour descend du ciel (1957) - L'agent de police
 Speaking of Murder (1957) - L'employé du garage (uncredited)
 Fric-frac en dentelles (1957)
 Vacances explosives! (1957) - Le camionneur qui transporte le tableau
 Les Lavandières du Portugal (1957) - Un peintre
 Comme un cheveu sur la soupe (1957) - L'employé du gaz
 La polka des menottes (1957) - Abadie - l'agent du commissariat
 Gates of Paris (1957) - L'épicier (uncredited)
 Anyone Can Kill Me (1957) - Le gardien-brigadier Bricart
 Maigret Sets a Trap (1958) - Le gardien de prison (uncredited)
 La Tour, prends garde ! (1958) - Un invité de Taupin (uncredited)
 Police judiciaire (1958) - Le chauffeur de bus témoin (uncredited)
 Back to the Wall (1958) - Le concierge (uncredited)
 Le temps des oeufs durs (1958) - M. Charretier, le concierge
 En bordée (1958)
 In Case of Adversity (1958) - Eugène - le patron du bazar (uncredited)
 Madame et son auto (1958)
 Sins of Youth (1958) - Un joueur de billard
 Le Sicilien (1958) - Le barman
 Suivez-moi jeune homme (1958)
 Serenade of Texas (1958) - Albert - l'employé du magasin
 Les motards (1959) - Le facteur myope
 Gangster Boss (1959) - Le voisin d'en face
 Too Late to Love (1959) - Un gendarme (uncredited)
 Le gendarme de Champignol (1959) - Le geôlier (uncredited)
 Soupe au lait (1959) - Un collègue
 Babette Goes to War (1959) - Le fuyard (uncredited)
 La marraine de Charley (1959) - Gaston
 The Cat Shows Her Claws (1960) - Un cheminot
 The Baron of the Locks (1960) - Un client de l'auberge
 Le 7eme jour de Saint-Malo (1960)
 Women Are Like That (1960) - Le brigadier au cabaret
 The Old Guard (1960) - Le fils Goujon
 Love and the Frenchwoman (1960) - (segment "Le Mariage")
 The Gigolo (1960) - Le poissonnier (uncredited)
 Le mouton (1960) - Le dîneur bousculé par Fernand
 La Vérité (1960) - Un journaliste (uncredited)
 Le caïd (1960) - Filâtre
 Boulevard (1960) - Gaston Duriez
 Les Tortillards (1960) - Le garde-champêtre
 Five Day Lover (1961) - Blanchet
 The President (1961) - Un gendarme
 Les livreurs (1961)
 Le cave se rebiffe (1961) - Le facteur
 All the Gold in the World (1961) - Le maire de Cabosse
 Le Tracassin (1961) - L'homme à la clinique qui sert du calva à André
 The Seven Deadly Sins (1962) - Le suisse à l'église (segment "Gourmandise, La") (uncredited)
 The Devil and the Ten Commandments (1962) - Le maraîcher / Truck Farmer (segment "Dien en vain ne jureras")
 The Gentleman from Epsom (1962) - Un joueur (uncredited)
 Le couteau dans la plaie (1962)
 Mandrin (1962)
 Three Fables of Love (1962) - Un collègue de Charles
 Les Bricoleurs (1963) - Le portier de l'agence immobilière (uncredited)
 Seul... à corps perdu (1963)
 Les vierges (1963) - Le pique-assiette
 Heaven Sent (1963) - Un sacristain
 Maigret Sees Red (1963) - Le concierge de l'hôtel (uncredited)
 À toi de faire... mignonne (1963)
 Dandelions by the Roots (1964) - Un joueur de tiercé (uncredited)
 Une souris chez les hommes (1964) - Le caissier du 'Bon Marché'
 Behold a Pale Horse (1964) - (uncredited)
 Male Companion (1964) - Monsieur Leroux (uncredited)
 Ces dames s'en mêlent (1965) - Policeman (uncredited)
 Le Majordome (1965) - Le curé (uncredited)
 La grosse caisse (1965) - Le chef de station (uncredited)
 Marie-Chantal contre le docteur Kha (1965) - (uncredited)
 The Sleeping Car Murders (1965) - Le patron du bistrot (uncredited)
 Les Bons Vivants (1965) - Le greffier (segment "Le procès")
 Dis-moi qui tuer (1965) - Le portier
 Thunderball (1965) - Priest at Bouvar's Funeral (uncredited)
 Le caïd de Champignol (1966) - Un paysan
 Une femme en blanc se révolte (1966)
 The Gardener of Argenteuil (1966) - Le patron du bistro
 Le deuxième souffle (1966) - Marcel le Stéphanois
 Les compagnons de la marguerite (1967) - Le charcutier
 Two for the Road (1967) - Customs Officer (uncredited)
 Action Man (1967) - Gaston
 Les risques du métier (1967) - Le contremaître Lucien Canet
 Les cracks (1968) - (uncredited)
 Ne jouez pas avec les Martiens (1968)
 The Return of Monte Cristo (1968) - Le gardien du cimetière (uncredited)
 The Night of the Following Day (1969) - Taxi driver (uncredited)
 Under the Sign of the Bull (1969) - Le bistrot des ferrailleurs
 L'auvergnat et l'autobus (1969) - L'hôtelier (uncredited)
 Les gros malins (1969) - Le patron du bistrot
 Army of Shadows (1969) - Gendarm
 Give Her the Moon (1970) - Le président du jury
 Elise, or Real Life (1970) - Un ouvrier au café
 L'âne de Zigliara (1970) - Le curé
 Un peu de soleil dans l'eau froide (1970) - (uncredited)
 Chut! (1972) - Le brigadier
 Projection privée (1973) - Le concierge de Denis
 Un amour de pluie (1974) - Le client du café
 Par ici la monnaie (1974)
 Black Thursday (1974) - Le plombier / Plumber
 Couche-moi dans le sable et fais jaillir ton pétrole... (1975) - Constantin, le percepteur
 Opération Lady Marlène (1975) - Un concierge
 L'évasion de Hassan Terro (1976)
 Scrambled Eggs (1976)
 Mimì Bluette... fiore del mio giardino (1976)
 The Wing or the Thigh (1976) - M. Morand - un employé de Duchemin
 Bartleby (1976) - Le cuisinier de la prison
 Le Gang (1977) - Le photographe
 Dis bonjour à la dame!.. (1977) - Le vieil ami de Robert à a fête
 Julie pot-de-colle (1977) - Un passager du train
 Le maestro (1977) - Le chauffeur de taxi
 L'imprécateur (1977)
 La Menace (1977) - Grocery Owner
 That Night in Varennes (1982) - (final film role)

References

Bibliography
 Ann C. Paietta. Saints, Clergy and Other Religious Figures on Film and Television, 1895–2003. McFarland, 2005.

External links

1909 births
1981 deaths
French male film actors
Actors from Nancy, France